Baghdad Mall is a multi-purpose building consisting of a shopping mall, a hotel and a medical centre. Located in Harthiya, Baghdad at the intersection between Damascus street and Al-Kindi street, it is one of the largest shopping malls in Baghdad.

The multi-level shopping mall currently features over one hundred retail outlets, a thousand parking spaces, and contains dozens of restaurants and cafés.

Baghdad Mall opened on August 28, 2017, taking 3 years to complete. The event was of symbolic value as part of the reconstruction efforts by the government of Prime Minister Haider al-Abadi, who personally attended the opening ceremony. The ceremony was co-hosted by Iraqi poet Shahad al-Shamary, and the ceremony featured musical guests such as Dalli, Hussam al-Rassam, Diana Karazon, and Hussein el-Deik.

Description 

Rayhaan Rotana Hotel 

Rayhaan Rotana is a 32-storey hotel and is part of the Rotana Hotel Management. The hotel has 241 rooms.

Dublin Health Medical Center 

Managed by Dublin Health Services, the medical center includes 30 specialized clinics.

References 

Shopping malls established in 2017
Buildings and structures in Baghdad